Collector is a 2011 Indian Malayalam-language political action thriller film directed by Anil C. Menon with Suresh Gopi in the lead. The film has Suresh Gopi playing the title role. The film is a socio-political thriller that takes a look at the contemporary social scene in the state. The film was dubbed in Telugu in the same name.

Plot

Avinash Varma is the District Collector of Ernakulam. He takes on several anti-social elements who rule the underworld of Kochi . Of them, Williams, who is a real estate businessman, is his biggest opponent. ACP Revathy, social activist Arundhati and a few honest and sincere government officers and the Chief Minister  are there to support Avinash Varma. The City Police Commissioner, the Lady Mayor Sethulakshmi of Kochi Corporation, and a couple of corrupt ministers and officials are supporting the illegal activities of Williams. In the age-old battle between the 'Good' and the 'Evil', Avinash Varma wins as expected, and his truth and honesty are rewarded.

Cast

Production
The film ran into financial troubles when its shooting was a mid way. Collector is the seventh directorial venture of Anil C. Menon. The production Controller of the Collector is Shibu G Suseelan.

Reception

Critical response
The film mostly received negative reviews upon release. Veeyen of nowrunning.com gave a negative review and said, "Collector fits into the socio-political thriller genre in Malayalam films to the 'T'. The film tries to speak a lot, but the fact is that not many are in a mood to listen. For, we have seen it all" and gave 1.5 stars of 5.

Indiaglitz gave a favorable review and said, "The highlights of the movie are the brilliant production values starting from its awesome title graphics to excellent cinematography by Manoj Paramahamsa. Some of the dialogues in the former half and climax are indeed interesting, though that is not the case with the entire movie."

Sify.com rated the movie as positive and said, "Collector is loud, formulaic and tailor made for those who are addicted to the age old good versus evil sagas. For those who get thrilled when the hero renders lines of dialogues to virtually everyone around and takes on a dozen hunks with sheer grit, this may be a fine film. For the rest of the world, this may not be such an exciting experience. The choice is yours!".

Soundtrack
 
The soundtrack features four songs composed by Reghu Kumar. The songs, as well as the choreography, received largely positive reviews. The songs managed to average the music charts in the initial weeks. This was the last work of Reghu Kumar, who died in 2014.

References

2010s Malayalam-language films
2010s political thriller films
2011 action thriller films
Films scored by Raghu Kumar
2011 films
Indian political thriller films
Indian action thriller films
Fictional portrayals of the Kerala Police
Films shot in Kochi
Political action films